Miller & Mayo, later Miller, Mayo & Beal, was a prominent architectural firm from Portland, Maine, established in Lewiston in 1907.

History
Miller & Mayo was established in January 1907 as the partnership of Lewiston architect William R. Miller and his head draftsman, Raymond J. Mayo. Seeking greater opportunities, they moved the office to Portland a year later, in 1908. The office had already had an essentially statewide reputation, but a move to Portland, the state's largest city, allowed work to be done there and in its suburbs.

The firm's work was diverse, but they placed special importance on the design of school buildings.

At about the same time Mayo became partner, Lester I. Beal was hired as a draftsman. In 1926, he became a partner, the firm becoming Miller, Mayo & Beal. That firm was dissolved in 1929 upon the withdrawal of Raymond J. Mayo, who opened his own office. The office became Miller & Beal, and Miller died on December 14. However, Beal continued to run the office as Miller & Beal, Inc.

Architectural works

Miller & Mayo, 1907-1926

Miller, Mayo & Beal, 1926-1929

Gallery

References

Architecture firms based in Maine